Kara-Murza is a surname of Tatar origin translated as "Black Prince" or "Dark Lord". Its Russified version is Karamzin. Kara Murza was a Tatar aristocrat who converted to Christianity after settling in Moscow in the 15th century.  The following people share this last name:
Sergey Kara-Murza (born 1939), Soviet/Russian historian, chemist and philosopher
Vladimir Alexeyevich Kara-Murza (1959–2019), Soviet/Russian TV anchor
Vladimir Vladimirovich Kara-Murza (born 1981), Russian journalist and opposition politician

Compound surnames
Russian-language surnames
Surnames of Tatar origin